Parachrysina is a genus of beetles in the family Scarabaeidae.

Species
 Parachrysina borealis
 Parachrysina truquii

References

Scarabaeidae genera
Rutelinae